The South Main Street Historic District is a residential historic district in Woonsocket, Rhode Island.  It extends along South Main Street between Mason Street on one end and Andrews and Bradford Streets on the other, and includes properties on adjacent streets, principally Ballou and North Ballou Streets.  The district includes 65 main properties, most of which were built between 1880 and 1930, although there is a cluster of older properties (Greek Revival houses dating as far back as 1830) in the northern half of the district. The district typifies the American main road leading into a town, lined by landscaped lots with high-quality houses.

The district was listed on the National Register of Historic Places in 1982.

See also
National Register of Historic Places listings in Providence County, Rhode Island

References

Historic districts in Providence County, Rhode Island
Woonsocket, Rhode Island
Historic districts on the National Register of Historic Places in Rhode Island
National Register of Historic Places in Providence County, Rhode Island